Marko Halonen (born August 15, 1967) is a Finnish former professional ice hockey defenceman.

Halonen played 179 games in the SM-liiga for Jokerit, Kiekko-Espoo and HPK. He won a championship in 1992 with Jokerit. Halonen also played in France for Brest Albatros Hockey.

References

External links

1967 births
Living people
Brest Albatros Hockey players
Espoo Blues players
Finnish ice hockey defencemen
HPK players
KooKoo players
Jokerit players
Ice hockey people from Helsinki
20th-century Finnish people
21st-century Finnish people